Rolepa delineata is a moth in the family Phiditiidae. It was described by Francis Walker in 1855.

References

Bombycoidea
Moths described in 1855